Antonio Gómez Pérez (born 1 August 1973) is a Spanish retired footballer who played as a midfielder, currently a manager.

Playing career
Born in Madrid, Gómez was brought up in La Liga giants Real Madrid's youth ranks, making his first-team debut in the 1995–96 season as Jorge Valdano was the team coach. He scored twice in only six appearances during the campaign, but his presence with the main squad would be merely testimonial.

After an unassuming loan to Sevilla FC – 14 matches out of 42, top-flight relegation– Gómez was released by Real Madrid, continuing his career with Albacete Balompié (Segunda División), Hércules CF (two seasons, one in Segunda División B), CD Toledo and amateurs La Roda CF and retiring in 2006 at the age of 33.

Coaching career
In the summer of 2006, immediately after retiring, Gómez started coaching, first with former club Albacete's youth team, with which he won the Copa del Rey of the category. Subsequently, he stayed two years with the reserves in the Tercera División.

Gómez re-joined former Real Madrid B coach Rafael Benítez in 2009, being named Liverpool's assistant while also training the club's reserve team. On 23 June 2010 he announced his move to Real Valladolid, signing for 2010–11 in division two after the dismissal of former Spain national team boss Javier Clemente.

On 29 November 2010, after a 0–1 home loss against FC Cartagena, Gómez was fired by Valladolid, even though the Castile and León side ranked seventh in the league. From June 2011 to March 2013, he managed former club Albacete in the third tier, and subsequently worked with Benítez at S.S.C. Napoli, Real Madrid, Newcastle United, Dalian Yifang F.C. and Everton.

Managerial statistics

Notes

References

External links

1973 births
Living people
Spanish footballers
Footballers from Madrid
Association football midfielders
La Liga players
Segunda División players
Segunda División B players
Tercera División players
Real Madrid C footballers
Real Madrid Castilla footballers
Real Madrid CF players
Sevilla FC players
Albacete Balompié players
Hércules CF players
CD Toledo players
La Roda CF players
Spanish football managers
Segunda División managers
Segunda División B managers
Tercera División managers
Real Valladolid managers
Albacete Balompié managers
Liverpool F.C. non-playing staff
Newcastle United F.C. non-playing staff
Everton F.C. non-playing staff
Real Madrid CF non-playing staff
Spanish expatriate sportspeople in England
Spanish expatriate sportspeople in Italy
Spanish expatriate sportspeople in China